(styled CiNG) was an independent video game developer based out of Fukuoka, Japan. The company, a small development house employing only 29 people, was founded in April 1999, and was run by Takuya Miyagawa, who served as President and CEO. Miyagawa also acted as the producer on all of Cing's titles. The company filed for bankruptcy on March 1, 2010.

Since releasing Glass Rose for the PlayStation 2 in 2003, Cing had enjoyed a close working relationship with Nintendo. Two projects were created in cooperation with the publisher for their Nintendo DS handheld system, both of which received sequels (one for the Nintendo DS and one for the Wii). Cing also released the critically acclaimed Little King's Story for the Wii.

History
Founded on April 22, 1999, Cing was created as a means of providing gamers with new and unique video game experiences. The studio's first project was providing the core production for Capcom's Glass Rose, an adventure title for Sony's PlayStation 2. Unfortunately, despite having Masahiro Matsuoka's likeness (from the popular Japanese pop group Tokio) for its main character, the title failed to prove successful at retail and was never localized in North America, although it did see a European release.

In early 2005, Cing released the adventure title Another Code: Two Memories for the DS, which marked their first project produced with Nintendo. The game made extensive use of the various unique capabilities of the DS, and proved to be a fairly moderate success. The studio's next project, Hotel Dusk: Room 215, was another adventure title making specific use of the DS functionality, including holding the system sideways to play (similar to Nintendo's Brain Age titles).

On March 13, 2007, Cing announced their next-generation video game title for the Nintendo Wii, titled Little King's Story. The game was released in Australia and Europe in April 2009, in North America on July 21, 2009, and in Japan on September 3, 2009. In November 2009, Cing announced Last Window: The Secret of Cape West, the sequel to Hotel Dusk: Room 215 for Nintendo DS. It was released on January 14, 2010 in Japan and September 17, 2010 in Europe.

Cing filed for bankruptcy in Japan on March 1, 2010. The company was reportedly suffering from liabilities of 256 million yen (USD 2.9m/EUR 2.1m).

Games developed

References

External links

Cing, profile on IGN

Privately held companies of Japan
Japanese companies established in 1999
Japanese companies disestablished in 2010
Video game companies established in 1999
Video game companies disestablished in 2010
Companies that have filed for bankruptcy in Japan
Defunct video game companies of Japan
Video game development companies
Companies based in Fukuoka Prefecture